The Ninth Air Force (9 AF) was a numbered air force of the United States Air Force's Air Combat Command (ACC).  It was headquartered at Shaw Air Force Base, South Carolina, from activation on 5 August 2009 until it was replaced by Fifteenth Air Force on 20 August 2020.  The prior and current Ninth Air Force is known as United States Air Forces Central (USAFCENT). On 20 August 2020, USAFCENT was again designated Ninth Air Force in addition to United States Air Forces Central.

Until August 2009, the Ninth Air Force shared its commander with USAFCENT. In a complicated transfer of lineage, the Second World War-and-after heritage of the Ninth Air Force was bestowed solely on United States Air Forces Central, and a totally new Ninth Air Force, was activated on the U.S. East Coast, where it is responsible for a variety of Air Combat Command units.

All Ninth Air Force units, as well as units of Twelfth Air Force, were consolidated into Fifteenth Air Force on 20 August 2020 and Ninth Air Force was inactivated.

Lineage 
 Established as Ninth Air Force on 4 August 2009
 Activated on 5 August 2009
 Inactivated on 20 August 2020
 Disbanded on 5 October 2020

Assignments
 Air Combat Command, 5 August 2009 – 20 August 2020

Major components
The command was responsible for operational readiness for eight active duty wings and two direct reporting units. These eight wings were:

 1st Fighter Wing, Joint Base Langley–Eustis, Virginia
 4th Fighter Wing, Seymour Johnson Air Force Base, North Carolina
 20th Fighter Wing, Shaw Air Force Base, South Carolina
 23rd Wing, Moody Air Force Base, Georgia
 93rd Air-Ground Operations Wing, Moody Air Force Base, Georgia
 325th Fighter Wing, Tyndall Air Force Base, Florida
 461st Air Control Wing, Robins Air Force Base, Georgia
 495th Fighter Group, Shaw Air Force Base, South Carolina
 633rd Air Base Wing, Joint Base Langley-Eustis, Virginia

Assigned non-flying direct reporting units included:
 800th RED HORSE Group, Nellis Air Force Base, Nevada, 1 June 2020 – 20 August 2020
 819th RED HORSE Squadron, Malmstrom Air Force Base, Montana
 823rd RED HORSE Squadron, Hurlburt Field, Florida

The Ninth Air Force was also responsible for overseeing the operational readiness of 30 designated units of the Air National Guard and Air Force Reserve.

List of commanders

Commander, Ninth Air Force

References

External links
 
 Archives of the Ninth Air Force Association Digital Collection at The University of Akron Archival Services
 Ninth Air Force Association

Military units and formations established in 2009
Military units and formations in South Carolina
09